The 2009 Wheelchair Tennis Masters (Also known as the 2009 NEC Wheelchair Tennis Masters for sponsor reasons). It was held on hard courts between the 18 and 22 November 2009. The tournament was held in Amsterdam and was part of the NEC Wheelchair Tennis Tour, under the Masters Series category of events.

Qualification
The top eight in men's and women's competition of the year qualified for the Wheelchair tennis masters. The top four from the Quad category also qualified for this event.

References

Masters, 2009
Wheelchair Tennis Masters
Wheelchair Tennis Masters
Tennis tournaments in the Netherlands